Blakeanthus is a genus of flowering plants in the family Asteraceae.

There is only one known species, Blakeanthus cordatus, native to Guatemala, El Salvador, and Honduras.

References

Monotypic Asteraceae genera
Flora of Central America
Eupatorieae